SCRIPT is a standard promulgated by the National Council for Prescription Drug Programs (NCPDP) for the electronically transmitted medical prescriptions in the United States.

Adoption
The first version of SCRIPT was approved in 1997.  Version 8.1 was proposed as a federal rule by the Centers for Medicare and Medicaid Services ("CMS") in November, 2007, and adopted in 2008, thereby mandating its use for medical providers that used electronic subscriptions, in order to obtain federal insurance reimbursement.  A new "backwards-compatible"version, 10.1, was adopted by the Surescripts pharmacy consortium in late 2009, to help its members participate in the electronic medical record incentive programs under the HITECH Act.  It was proposed by CMS as a rule in June, 2010.

References

External links
NCPDP standards page

Pharmacy in the United States
Standards for electronic health records